

England

Head coach: Martin Green

 Rob Andrew
 Steve Bainbridge
 Stuart Barnes
 Gary Chilcott
 David Cusani
 Graham Dawe
 Wade Dooley
 Jon Hall
 Simon Halliday
 Richard Harding
 Mike Harrison (c.)*
 Richard Hill (c.)
 Gary Pearce
 Nigel Redman
 Paul Rendall
 Dean Richards
 Marcus Rose
 Jamie Salmon
 Kevin Simms
 Paul Simpson
 Rory Underwood
 Peter Williams
 Peter Winterbottom

 captain in the last game

France

Head coach: Jacques Fouroux

 Pierre Berbizier
 Philippe Bérot
 Serge Blanco
 Éric Bonneval
 Jean Condom
 Éric Champ
 Denis Charvet
 Daniel Dubroca (c.)
 Dominique Erbani
 Jean-Pierre Garuet-Lempirou
 Francis Haget
 Jean-Baptiste Lafond
 Alain Lorieux
 Franck Mesnel
 Pascal Ondarts
 Laurent Rodriguez
 Philippe Sella

Ireland

Head coach: Mick Doyle

 Willie Anderson
 Michael Bradley
 Nigel Carr
 Keith Crossan
 Paul Dean
 Des Fitzgerald
 James Glennon
 Harry Harbison
 Michael Kiernan
 Donal Lenihan (c.)
 Hugo MacNeill
 Phillip Matthews
 Brendan Mullin
 Phil Orr
 Trevor Ringland
 Brian Spillane

Scotland

Head coach: Jim Telfer

 Roger Baird
 John Beattie
 Finlay Calder
 Colin Deans (c.)
 Matt Duncan
 Gavin Hastings
 Scott Hastings
 John Jeffrey
 Roy Laidlaw
 Iain Milne
 Iain Paxton
 Keith Robertson
 John Rutherford
 David Sole
 Alan Tomes
 Iwan Tukalo
 Derek White
 Douglas Wyllie

Wales

Head coach: Tony Gray

 Richie Collins
 Malcolm Dacey
 Jonathan Davies
 Phil Davies
 John Devereux
 Ieuan Evans
 Stuart Evans
 Peter Francis
 Adrian Hadley
 Kevin Hopkins
 Billy James
 Robert Jones
 Paul Moriarty
 Bob Norster
 Kevin Phillips
 Dai Pickering (c.)
 Steve Sutton
 Paul Thorburn
 Glen Webbe
 Jeff Whitefoot
 Mark Wyatt

External links
1987 Five Nations Championship Statistics

Six Nations Championship squads